
"Just Abuse Me" was the first release from Bournemouth-based alternative rock band Air Traffic. It was released as a double a-side with "Charlotte", a song which would later be re-released as a solo single.

The vinyl was the 5th in a series of black and white 7-inch records released by Label Fandango, the independent record label from the creators of live music promotion company Club Fandango. It was described by the label as "Piano-led indie rock". The vinyl would lead to the band's major label signing, as following Zane Lowe playing "Just Abuse Me" on his BBC Radio 1 show, the band were signed to a long-term contract by EMI in May 2006.

"Just Abuse Me"/"Charlotte" was ineligible to chart in the UK Singles Chart as it was limited to 500 copies.

Track listing
7" record(GALAGOS005)
 "Just Abuse Me" - 2:33
 "Charlotte" - 2:25

References

2006 singles
2006 songs